The Taylor Key Award is one of the highest awards of the Society for Advancement of Management. This management awards is awarded annually to one or more persons for "the outstanding contribution to the advancement of the art and science of management as conceived by Frederick W. Taylor."

The Taylor Key has been awarded in cooperation with the American Management Association.

Award winners 
The award winners have been:

 1937: George W. Barnwell, and George T. Trundle Jr.
 1938: Asa A. Knowles, and Hugo Diemer
 1939: Moritz A. Dittmer and William H. Gesell and 
 1940: Henry S. Dennison
 1941: Morris L. Cooke
 1942: King Hathaway
 1943: Harlow S. Person
 1944: Henry P. Kendall
 1945: Henry P. Dutton
 1946: Robert B. Wolf 
 1947: Harry Arthur Hopf  
 1948: Dexter S. Kimball
 1949: Herbert C. Hoover
 1950: Brehon B. Somervell
 1951: No Award
 1952: Harold F. Smiddy and Donald K. Davis
 1954: Henning W. Prentis
 1956: F. J. Roethlisberger
 1958: Ralph C. Davis ; Frank Henry Neely
 1960: John B. Joynt
 1961: Lawrence A. Appley
 1963: Harold B. Maynard and Lyndall F. Urwick
 1965: Phil Carroll
 1966: Robert S. McNamara
 1967: Peter F. Drucker
 1968: Nobuo Noda
 1971. Donald C. Burnham
 1972: John F. Mee 
 1973: J. Allyn Taylor
 1974: Harold Koontz
 1980: Edward C. Schleh
 1982: Allan H. Mogensen
 1983: W. Edwards Deming
 1998: Nobuo Shigenaga
 2000: Moustafa H. Abdelsamad
 2005: William I. Sauser, Jr. 
 2019: Edwin A. Fleishman

Other prominent winners of the Taylor Key Awards have been Don G. Mitchell, and Kaichiro Nishino.

References 

Awards established in 1937
Management awards
1937 establishments in the United States